"Te Quiero" (English: I Love You) is a 2010 song by Belgian singer Stromae, released on May 10, 2010, as a CD-promo-single and on June 7 it was released as the 5th promo-single for his first album, Cheese. The official release date as a single of the album was August 27. The song has charted in Belgium, the Czech Republic, Poland and in Switzerland.

Music video
The official music video of the song shows Stromae himself at a filming stage falling in love with his film partner. The video was styled by fashion designer and stylist Valentine Avoh.

Unofficial music video
On May 28, 2010, Stromae uploaded an unofficial music video of the song, in which he walks into a huge hall, goes to a microphone standing in the middle of it, singing the song and then leaving. This video is called "Stromae - "Te Quiero" ... ceci n'est pas un clip" (‘Te Quiero...this is not a music video’).

In the video, Stromae emulates the gestures and impassioned style of Jacques Brel. The lyrics reference Brel as well: "Je voudrais être son ombre/ Mais je la déteste" ("I wanted to be her shadow/ But I hate her") echoes "Laisse-moi devenir/ L'ombre de ton ombre" ("Let me become/ The shadow of your shadow") in Brel's "Ne Me Quitte Pas".

Track listings
 "Te Quiero" (3:23)
 "Te Quiero (Paul Kalkbrenner Remix)" (7:06)

Personnel
Lead vocals
Stromae
Management
Dimitri Borrey
Mastered By
Pieter Wagter "Equus"
Production
Mosaert - producer
Lion Hell Capouillez - mixing
Vince Lattuca  - mixing
Dati Bendo - Artwork
Guillaume Mortier - Artwork
Luc Junior Tam - Artwork
Romain Biharz - Artwork
Dati Bendo - photography

Chart performance

Weekly charts

Year-end charts

Certifications

References

External links

2010 singles
Stromae songs
Eurodance songs
Songs written by Stromae
2010 songs